Sophie Luise of Württemberg (19 February 1642, in Stuttgart – 3 October 1702, in Bayreuth) was a Margravine of Brandeburg-Bayreuth as the wife of Christian Ernst, Margrave of Brandenburg-Bayreuth.

Biography
She married Christian Ernst, Margrave of Brandenburg-Bayreuth from 1655 to 1712, widower of Sophia of Saxe-Weissenfels the year before. The marriage was celebrated in Stuttgart on 8 February 1671.

Sophie-Louise gave her husband six children:
 Christiane Eberhardine (29 December 1671, Bayreuth – 5 September 1727, Pretzsch)
 Elenore Magdalene (24 January 1673, Bayreuth – 13 December 1711, Ettlingen)
 Klaudia Eleonore Sofie (4 July 1675, Bayreuth – 11 February 1676, Bayreuth)
 Charlotte Emilie (4 June 1677, Bayreuth – 15 February 1678, Bayreuth)
 Georg Wilhelm (26 November 1678, Bayreuth – 18 December 1726, Bayreuth)
 Karl Ludwig (21 November 1679, Bayreuth – 7 April 1680, Bayreuth)

She died on 3 October 1702 and was buried in Bayreuth. Her husband remarried the following year to Elisabeth Sophie of Brandenburg and they had no further children. Of the surviving children, George William became a margrave on the death of his father in 1712, while Christiane-Eberhardine married Frederick Augustus, Duke of Saxony, King of Poland, in 1693.

Ancestry

References 

1642 births
1702 deaths
German princesses
German duchesses
Daughters of monarchs